Rowton Halt railway station was a station in Rowton, Shropshire, England. The station was opened in 1935 and closed in 1963. The halt was located to the south of a road over bridge and there were steps down to the platforms. The site of the halt has now been infilled.

References

Further reading

Disused railway stations in Shropshire
Railway stations in Great Britain opened in 1935
Railway stations in Great Britain closed in 1963
Former Great Western Railway stations